Fuming may refer to;

Ammonia fuming, a technique for darkening oak and other woods
Sun Fuming, a Chinese judoka who competed in the 1996 Summer Olympics